The Jimi Hendrix Memorial Concerts: 1995 is a live, double CD composed entirely of Jimi Hendrix covers. It is The Hamsters fifth CD release.

The tour the album ultimately derived from was performed as a tribute to Jimi Hendrix as a celebration of 25 years since his death. The band's first album, Electric Hamsterland, also a compilation of Hendrix covers, was released in 1990, 20 years after the death of Hendrix. For the 25th anniversary the band decided to do a full UK tour playing predominantly Hendrix covers. This album was recorded during that tour, as was a concert film, Band of Gerbils which was initially released on VHS with a subsequent release on DVD ten years later.

Track listing

Disk 1 (Red CD)
 "Foxy Lady" – 4:20
 "Fire" – 3:53
 "Little Wing" – 6:39
 "Izabella" – 5:05
 "Up From The Skies" – 4:51
 "Power of Soul" – 1:10
 "Spanish Castle Magic" – 3:54
 "Rock Me, Baby" – 2:49
 "Voodoo Chile" – 6:49
 "Hey, Baby (Land of the New Rising Sun)" – 5:53
 "Burning of the Midnight Lamp" – 3:48
 "Ezy Rider" – 4:10
 "Hey Joe'" – 5:52

Disk 2 (Purple CD)
 "Voodoo Child (Slight Return)" – 6:58
 "Room Full of Mirrors" – 4:31
 "Third Stone From The Sun" – 3:59
 "Come On (Let the Good Times Roll)" – 3:46
 "51st Anniversary" – 3:55
 "I Don't Live Today" – 2:12
 "Love or Confusion" – 3:37
 "The Wind Cries Mary" – 3:38
 "Manic Depression" – 4:05
 "Stone Free" – 3:44
 "All Along the Watchtower" – 5:53
 "Star-Spangled Banner" – 3:38
 "Purple Haze'" – 4:32
 "Angel" – 4:19

Musicians
Snail's-Pace Slim —- guitars, lead vocals.
Rev Otis Elevator —- drums, vocals.
Ms Zsa Zsa Poltergeist —- bass, vocals.

Production
 Recorded live at the Robin Hood, Brierley Hill, West Midlands, UK on the 'Zipper Mobile'.
 Recording supervised by Richard Willis
 Mixed by Dave Morris & Mark Tempest at Workshop Studios, Redditch, Worcestershire.
 Post-production sonic enhancement and editing by Jerry Stevenson.
 Mastered by Iestyn Rees.
 Produced by The Hamsters
 Cover design by Phil Smee of Waldo's Design Emporium.
 Cover concept by The Hamsters
 'Jimi Hamster' design by Des Penny
 Photography by Nixon

The Hamsters albums
1990 live albums
Jimi Hendrix tribute albums